Explosiw is a Siw Malmkvist studio album, released in August 1976 on the Metronome Records label. It was recorded between January–May of that year. The album was Malmkvist's last for Metronome Records before deciding to quit as a recording artist. She subsequently returned sporadically.

Track listing

Side A
Jag har en fågel - Torsten Wallin
Genom dimmor och dis (One Day in Your Life) - Renée Armand, Sam Brown, Marie Bergman
Jag vill ha slowfox igen (I Wanna Slow Dance Again) – Helms, Hirsch, Wayne
Jag låter bli dej (Heat Wave), - Lamont Dozier, Brian Holland, Eddie Holland, Bo Carlgren
Kalle me' felan - (Gösta Linderholm)
 Jag gillar dans (I Love to Love) -James Bolden, Jack Robinson

Side B
Du kom hem (Welcome Back) -Sebastian John, Bobo Karlsson, Ingrid Larsson
I tid och rum (He Closes his Eyes)- Charles Fox, Bo Rehnberg
Känslor (Feelings) - Morris Albert, Patrice Hellberg
Min jord (Bravo monsieur le monde) -Michel Fugain, Kajenn
Endera dan (Some of these Days) - Shelton Brooks, Bo Carlgren
Sovsång - Totte Wallin

Charts

References 

1976 albums
Siw Malmkvist albums
Swedish-language albums